Evelio Diaz-Cia (February 17, 1902 in San Cristóbal, Pinar del Río, Cuba – July 21, 1984  in Havana, Cuba) was the Archbishop of the Archdiocese of Havana.

His parents were Arturo Díaz-Díaz and Francisca Cía-López. He was baptised at his parish church in San Cristobal on February 7, 1903, by Father Marcelino Herrero-de Dios (Registered in Box 19 of Baptisms, Folio 387, number 1260).  He completed his religious studies at the San Carlos and San Ambrosio Seminary.

He was ordained a priest on September 12, 1926, and was named Chaplain of the Cathedral of Havana. On June 18, 1927, he was assigned to the Parish of  Nuestra Señora de Montserrate.  On April 2, 1940, named Chaplain to the Ursulines Sisters.  On September 10, 1935,  he was named Professor of Church History and Sociology at the San Carlos y San Ambrosio Seminary.  He was assigned to the parish of Santo Ángel on February 15, 1939, and on April 11, 1940, Vice-Rector of the Seminary and six days after that Chaplain of the Sagrado Corazón de Tejadillo.

Diaz-Cia was elevated to Bishop of Pinar del Río on December 26, 1941, by Pope Pius XII.  He was consecrated on March 1, 1942, in the Cathedral of Pinar del Río by  Mons. Giorgio Caruana, Titular Archbishop of Sebaste, Apostolic Nuncio of Cuba and assisted by Mons. Enrique Pérez-Serantes, Bishop of Camagüey and by Mons. Alberto Martín y Villaverde, Bishop of Matanzas. In 1958 he wrote the famous  "Oración por la Paz" (Prayer for Peace).  He was named Titular Bishop of  Lamdia and named Auxiliary Bishop of Cardinal Manuel Arteaga-Betancourt, Archbishop of Havana and Apostolic Administrator ad nutum Sanctae Sedis on March 21, 1959. On that same date he was named Apostolic Administrator of Pinar del Río and remained in that position until January 16, 1960, when Mons. Manuel Rodriguez-Rozas was named Bishop of Pinar del Río. On May 31, 1959, he declared his approval of the agrarian Reforms in the magazine Bohemia without knowing how it was to be implemented.  Promoted to Titular Archbishop of Petra di Palestina and named  Coadjutor sedis datus of Havana on November 14, 1959.  He participated in the National Catholic Congress held in Havana on November 28–29, 1959. He was arrested and held for a few days in April 1961 during the Bay of Pigs Invasion.

On August 4, 1961, Diaz-Cia was given the right of succession to the Archdiocese of Havana.  He succeeded as Archbishop of Havana on March 21, 1963, upon the death of Cardinal Arteaga.  On April 10, 1969, he was pressured to sign a document asking for the ending of the U.S. economic blockade against Cuba.  He resigned his office of Archbishop of Havana and took the title of Titular Archbishop of Celene on January 26, 1970. He was succeeded by Mons. Francisco Ricardo Oves-Fernandez, Titular Bishop of Montecorvino and Auxiliary Bishop of the Diocese of Cienfuegos. Diaz-Cia renounced his titular see and assumed the title of  Archbishop Emeritus of the Archdiocese of Havana on December 26, 1970.

He died on July 21, 1984, in Havana.  His funeral was held at the Cathedral of Havana and he is buried  in the Colon Cemetery.  In his funeral procession was the Pro Nuncio in Cuba, Mons. Giulio Einaudi and the members of the Conferencia Episcopal Cubana were present.

References
 Catholic Hierarchy bio
 Episcopologio de la Iglesia Católica en Cuba 

1902 births
1984 deaths
People from Pinar del Río
Roman Catholic archbishops of Havana
20th-century Roman Catholic archbishops in Cuba
Participants in the Second Vatican Council
Roman Catholic bishops of Pinar del Río
Roman Catholic bishops of Havana